S Ursae Minoris (S UMi) is a long period variable star in the constellation Ursa Minor, ranging from magnitude 7.5 to fainter than 13.2 over a period of 331 days.

References

Ursa Minor (constellation)
M-type giants
Mira variables
Ursae Minoris, S
Emission-line stars
075847
139492